The following is a list of recurring Saturday Night Live characters and sketches introduced between October 8, 1983, and May 12, 1984, the ninth season of SNL.

Dwight MacNamara
He was a narrator for educational films played by Gary Kroeger. At times, he would imitate the warbly sound of an incorrectly threaded film projector. Debuted November 12, 1983.

Hello, Trudy!
A James Belushi and Julia Louis-Dreyfus sketch. Debuted December 10, 1983.

El Dorko
A Gary Kroeger sketch. Debuted January 28, 1984.

Worthington Clotman
An NBC censor played by Tim Kazurinsky. He was an uptight gentleman who wore a bow-tie and glasses.  The character was based on the head NBC censor at the time, Bill Clotworthy. Debuted January 28, 1984.

Wayne Huevos
Huevos was a suave albeit smarmy Latin-American businessman played by Tim Kazurinsky. He often appeared on "Saturday Night News" with ideas to clean up New York City. Debuted February 18, 1984.

References

Lists of recurring Saturday Night Live characters and sketches
Saturday Night Live
Saturday Night Live
Saturday Night Live in the 1980s